Tokuyama (written: 徳山 literally "virtue mountain") may refer to:

Locations
Tokuyama Dam, a dam in Gifu Prefecture, Japan
Tokuyama Domain, a Japanese domain of the Edo period
Tokuyama Station, a train station in Yamaguchi Prefecture, Japan
Tokuyama, Yamaguchi, a former city of Yamaguchi Prefecture, Japan
Suruga-Tokuyama Station, a train station Shizuoka Prefecture, Japan

Entities
Tokuyama Corporation, a Japanese chemical company
Tokuyama University, a university in Yamaguchi, Japan
Tokuyama Women's College, a junior college in Yamaguchi, Japan

Other uses
Tokuyama (surname), a Japanese surname